The 1935 Connecticut State Huskies football team represented Connecticut State College, now the University of Connecticut, in the 1935 college football season.  The Huskies were led by second-year head coach J. Orlean Christian and completed the season with a record of 2–4–1.

Schedule

References

Connecticut State
UConn Huskies football seasons
Connecticut State Huskies football